Walnut Valley is a valley in California.

Walnut Valley may also refer to:

Walnut Valley Festival, a music festival in Kansas
Walnut Valley (Highgate, Virginia), a historic farmstead